A Dark Place (also titled Steel Country) is a 2019 British-American mystery thriller film directed by Simon Fellows and starring Andrew Scott, Bronagh Waugh and Denise Gough.

Cast
 Andrew Scott as Donald Devlin
 Bronagh Waugh as Donna Reutzel
 Denise Gough as Linda Connolly
 Michael Rose as Sheriff Benjamin Mooney
 Christa Bell Campbell as Wendy Connolly
 Sandra Ellis Lafferty as Betty Devlin
 Andrew Massett as Dr. Joel Pomorski
 Griff Furst as Max Himmler
 Jason Davis as Jerry Zeigler
 Kate Forbes as Patty Zeigler
 Cory Scott Allen as Randy Helsel

Reception
The film has  rating on Rotten Tomatoes.  Odie Henderson of RogerEbert.com awarded the film two and a half stars.  Ben Travis of Empire awarded the film three stars out of five.  Stephen Carty of Radio Times also awarded the film three stars out of five. Dennis Harvey of Variety gave the film a positive review and wrote "The result is diverting enough, yet ends up more a mildly offbeat time-filler than something memorable." Frank Scheck of The Hollywood Reporter also gave the film a positive review and wrote "Scott's strong, startling performance is the most effective element of Simon Fellows' offbeat crime thriller."

References

External links
 
 

2010s mystery thriller films
British mystery thriller films
American mystery thriller films
2019 films
2019 thriller films
2010s English-language films
Films directed by Simon Fellows
2010s American films
2010s British films